The Radlefshorn is a mountain of the Urner Alps, overlooking Gadmen in the canton of Bern. On its southern side it overlooks the Trift Glacier and the lake of Trift.

References

External links
 Radlefshorn on Hikr

Mountains of the Alps
Mountains of Switzerland
Mountains of the canton of Bern
Two-thousanders of Switzerland